Milica Nikolić (born 7 November 1994) is a Serbian judoka. She won European Championships bronze in 2018 in Tel Aviv.

She competed at the 2020 Summer Olympics in the women's 48 kg event, in which she was eliminated by the two-time world champion Daria Bilodid in a tight fight in the second round.

Achievements

References

External links
 
 

1994 births
Living people
Serbian female judoka
Mediterranean Games silver medalists for Serbia
Mediterranean Games medalists in judo
Competitors at the 2018 Mediterranean Games
Competitors at the 2022 Mediterranean Games
European Games competitors for Serbia
Judoka at the 2019 European Games
Judoka at the 2020 Summer Olympics
Olympic judoka of Serbia
21st-century Serbian women